Svetlîi is a commune in the Gagauz Autonomous Territorial Unit of the Republic of Moldova. It is composed of two villages, Alexeevca and Svetlîi. The 2004 census listed Svetlîi as having a population of 2,271 people.   Gagauz total 805. Minorities included 326 Moldovans, 235 Russians, 319 Ukrainians, 549 Bulgarians, 1 Pole, 3 Roma and 33 'other nationality'. At the same census, Alexeevca had 388 people.   Gagauz total 130. Minorities included 75 Moldovans, 36 Bulgarians, 49 Russians, 92 Ukrainians and 6 'other nationalities.'

The geographical coordinates of Svetlîi are 46° 0' 37" North, 28° 39' 46" East. Those of Alexeevca are 46° 1' 35" North, 28° 34' 3" East.

History of Svetlîi

In 1913, the first group of 21 settlers bought land from 25 to 50 acres each from the wealthy landowners Alfred Schlenger and the widow of Julia Schponer, whose lands are located on the right bank of the Ialpug River - from present-day Chioselia to Balaban. Then, in the following years (1920s-1930s), other German colonists arrived. The first founders of the village were:

 Immanuel Schottle,
 Daniel Scheible,
 Freidrich Heer,
 Christian Hofel,
 Georg Schiwa,
 Johann Seitz,
 Heinrich Muller,
 Christian Getz,
 Johann Weestz,
 Adam Kohlbach et al.

The Germans built large houses, designed for 2-3 families. The houses were made of burnt bricks and covered with red tiles. Today, only two such houses have been preserved in Svetlîi. The rich Germans in the fields hogwashed poor from neighboring villages - Cazaclia, Congaz, Corten, Cealîc, Samurza, etc. By 1940s, 42 houses were built.

The favorable climatic conditions of the south of Bessarabia and the richest, fertile soil determined the economic activities of the German colonists - this is farming (viticulture, melon growing, growing winter crops, sunflower, flax, hemp) and cattle breeding (cattle, sheep).

Following with the restoration of Soviet power in the village of Denevița Nouǎ, a village council was created, which consisted of the above points of the Congaz district, and a motor-tractor station was established, in Alexeevca village - collective farm "28 June". The village council, MTS, and collective farm were liquidated with the start of the war. In October 1944, after the re-entry of the territory of modern Moldova in the USSR, the Denevița state farm was established on the basis of the former collective farm "28 June" in the village. It was entered by residents of the settlements of Denevița, Alexeevca and Corten Nou, including the former workers of the collective farm “28 June”.

The history of Svetlîi settlement is closely connected with the history of the state farms "Cealîc", "Denevița", the collective farm "28 June", and with settlements Alexeevca, Corten Nou, Samurza and Cealîc. These villages for a long time were in the administrative subordination of the village council Denevița. In 1954, the state farms "Denevița" and "Cealîc" merged into one farm - the state farm "Cealîc".

By the Decree of the Presidium of the Supreme Council of the MSSR dated July 3, 1950, No. 5502, the village of Denevița was renamed the village of Svetlîi, and the village council of Denevița became the village council of Svetlîi.

From the beginning of the 1960s to the mid-1990s of the 20th century, entire neighborhoods of individual residential houses were built in Svetlîi for the specialists of the state farm technical school. In 1969, a three-storey high school building for 960 places and school workshops were commissioned. In 1982, the Palace of Culture was opened for 750 people. In 1972, the administrative building of the village council, consumer services house, and veterinary clinic were built. In 1986, a kindergarten was built with 200 places.

In connection with the renaming of the state farm-technical school in 1992 into an agrarian-technical college, in the following years the state farm ceased to exist. In carrying out the program "Pǎmânt" all fixed assets and land farms were privatized. On the basis of the former farm, LLC Mekagronomiya Plus was established.

On March 5, 1995, at a national referendum held on the issue of joining the autonomous territorial unit of Gagauzia (Gagauz Yeri), residents of the villages of Svetlîi and Alexeevca voted for entering a new entity. The village of Corten Nou, which at one time was part of the administrative subordination of the mayor's office of Svetlîi, remained under the administrative subordination of the Taraclia district. As a result of the construction and development of settlements, the village of Svetlîi and the village of Corten Nou merged into one settlement as far back as the 1960s. With the passage of time, the former village of Corten Nou, inhabited by ethnic Bulgarians, became one of the streets of the village of Svetlîi and was named after Georgi Dimitrov, but now it is again a separate village, which, unlike Svetlîi, is in Taraclia district.

Alexeevca

The area of the village Alexeevca is approximately 0.64 km2.

According to the 2004 census, the population of the village was 388 people: 48.97% were male; 51.03% = female

The documentary mention of the village Alexeevca dates back to 1913. According to the mention, the name of the village was given by the Ukrainian immigrants who came here from the village of the same name.

In official documents, the name of the village is registered as the village of Alexeevca.

In the 1940s, more than 500 people lived in the village: 495 were Russians and Ukrainians, and 9 were Gagauz people.

References

Communes of Gagauzia